Rhonda Ross Kendrick (born Rhonda Suzanne Silberstein; August 14, 1971) is an American singer and former actress. She is the daughter of singer and actress Diana Ross. She was born in Los Angeles and raised by Ross and her first husband, Robert Ellis Silberstein. Her biological father is Motown Records founder Berry Gordy, but she was raised by her former stepfather Silberstein, a man she remains close with today, and he is considered her legal father.

Early life 
At the time of Rhonda's birth, Diana Ross was married to her first husband, Robert Ellis Silberstein. Ross, Gordy, and Silberstein all knew of Rhonda's parentage. She was publicly presented as the daughter of Ross and Silberstein, and he raised her. When she was 13, she was told Gordy was her biological father. Ross Kendrick has said that the revelation came as a relief. She was beginning to notice physical differences between herself and her younger sisters. The revelation gave her an answer to the situation. Rhonda Ross Kendrick is the eldest of Diana Ross' five children and the seventh of Berry Gordy's eight biological children. She is a graduate of Brown University.

Career 
Ross Kendrick's most famous acting credit is Toni Burrell on Another World. She played the role from 1997 to 1999 and was nominated for a Daytime Emmy Award in 1998. She also appeared in the movie The Personals (1999) with Malik Yoba as well as The Temptations miniseries with her relative Bianca Lawson. In 2004, she released her debut live album Rhonda Ross Live Featuring Rodney Kendrick.

After working for two years as an agent with the firm Citi Habitats, she founded Ross Realty International, a real-estate brokerage firm in New York City in 2008.

In 2013, she joined her mother (Diana Ross) on the In the Name of Love Tour as the opening act for her concerts. In July 2016, she released her first studio album In Case You Didn't Know. The album spawned the singles "Summer Day" and "In Case You Didn't Know".

Personal life 
On September 13, 1996, she married jazz musician Rodney Kendrick. On August 7, 2009, she gave birth to their son.

Discography 
 Rhonda Ross Live Featuring Rodney Kendrick (2004)
 In Case You Didn't Know (2016)

Filmography

References

External links 
Official website

Ross Realty International

American soap opera actresses
African-American actresses
Brown University alumni
1971 births
Living people
Actresses from Los Angeles
Gordy family
20th-century American actresses
Silberstein family